The PONA number is an index for oil components. It is used to determine the paraffins (P), olefins (O), naphthenes (N) and aromatics (A) content of FCC (fluid catalytic cracking) and coker (visbreaker) gasoline.

The PONA number is significant in determining the quality of naphtha. There are various grades of naphtha produced depending on the PONA specifications, such as 60/15, 65/12, 70/10, etc. The first number is the minimum allowable total parafins percentage and the second number specifies the maximum allowable aromatics percentage. It also determines the price of naphtha in international markets.

See also
Crude oil assay
 SARA

References

Petroleum